The Chill Out Project is the first compilation released from Anton Ramos' The Chillout Project series.

Track listing
 Mono - The Outsider
 Wamdue Project - Instrumentation
 Art of Noise - Dreaming In Colour
 Groove Armada - Inside My Mind (Blue Skies)
 The Gentle People - Emotion Heater (Vocal Mix)
 Moloko - It's Nothing
 Smoke City - Numbers
 Aim - Sail
 LTJ X-perience - Moon Beat
 Cordara Orchestra - Jet Society
 Skyray - Girl In A Birdcage
 Ohm Guru - Montidevenere
 Kinobe - Slip Into Something
 Thievery Corporation - Lebanese Blonde (French Version)
 A Tribe Called Quest vs. Groove Armada - Description Of A Fool
 Watergate - Heart of Asia (Astro Heavenly Remix)

2000 compilation albums
The Chillout Project albums